The Second French Empire remained officially neutral throughout the American Civil War and never recognized the Confederate States of America. The United States  warned that recognition would mean war. France was reluctant to act without British collaboration, and the British government rejected intervention.

Emperor Napoleon III realized that a war with the United States without allies "would spell disaster" for France. However, the textile industry used cotton, and Napoleon had sent an army to control Mexico, which could be greatly aided by the Confederacy. At the same time, other French political leaders, such as Foreign Minister Édouard Thouvenel, supported the United States.

Public opinion and economics

The 22 political newspapers in Paris reflected the range of French public opinion. Their position on the war was determined by their political values regarding democracy, Napoleon III, and their prediction of the ultimate outcome. Issues such as slavery; the Trent affair, which involved Britain; and the economic impact on the French cotton industry did not influence the editors.  Their positions on the war determined their responses to such issues.  The Confederacy was supported by the conservative supporters of Napoleon III, Legitimists loyal to the House of Bourbon, and Roman Catholic leaders. The Union had the support of Republicans and Orléanists (those who wanted a descendant of Louis Philippe I and the House of Orléans on the throne).

Between 1861 and 1865, the Union blockade cut off Confederate cotton supplies to French textile mills. However France had amassed a large surplus of cotton in 1861, and shortages did not occur until late 1862. By 1863 shortages caused the famine du coton (cotton famine). Mills in Alsace, Nord-Pas-de-Calais, and Normandy saw prices of cotton double by 1862 and were forced to lay off many workers. However there were cotton imports from India and from the Union, and also government-sponsored public works projects to provide jobs for unemployed textile workers. Napoleon was eager to help the Confederacy, but his two foreign ministers were strongly opposed,  as were many business interests. They recognized that  trade with the Union trumped the need for Confederate cotton. The Union was the chief importer of French silk, wines, watches, pottery and porcelain, and was an essential provider of wheat and potash to the French economy. As a result the economic factors weighted in favor of neutrality.

Government policy
The French government considered the American war a relatively minor issue while France was engaged in multiple diplomatic endeavors in Europe and around the world. Emperor Napoleon III was interested in Central America for trade and plans of a transoceanic canal. He knew that the US strongly opposed and the Confederacy tolerated his plan to create a new empire in Mexico, where his troops landed in December 1861.

William L. Dayton, the American minister to France, met the French Foreign Minister, Édouard Thouvenel, who was pro-Union and was influential in dampening Napoleon’s initial inclination towards diplomatic recognition of Confederate independence. However, Thouvenel resigned from office in 1862. 

The Confederate delegate in Paris, John Slidell, was not officially received. However, he made offers to Napoleon III that in exchange for French recognition of the Confederate States and naval help sent to break the blockade, the Confederacy would sell raw cotton to France. Count Walewski and Eugène Rouher agreed with him, but British disapproval and especially the Union capture of New Orleans in the spring of 1862 led French diplomacy to oppose the plan. In 1864, Napoleon III sent his confidant, the Philadelphian Thomas W. Evans, as an unofficial diplomat to Lincoln and US Secretary of State William H. Seward. Evans convinced Napoleon that Southern defeat was impending.

Slidell succeeded in negotiating a loan of $15,000,000 from Frédéric Émile d'Erlanger and other French capitalists. The money was used to buy ironclad warships as well as military supplies that came in by blockade runners.

Proposed armistice
France proposed a joint mediation with Great Britain and Russia to end the war beginning with a joint armistice with the reasons being the suffering of the Southern people, the harmful economic impact of the war on Europe, particularly the cotton market, and the seeming impossibility of the two sides independently reaching a quick end to the conflict

The Emperor stated:

The proposal was printed in French newspapers on 15 November 1862 after discussions with representatives of the Confederate States of America and Great Britain in October.

Warships
In keeping with its official neutrality, the French government blocked the sale of the ironclad CSS Stonewall prior to delivery to the Confederacy in February 1864 and resold the ship to the Royal Danish Navy. However, the Danes refused to accept the ship because of price disagreements with the shipbuilder, L'Arman. L'Arman subsequently secretly resold the ship by January 1865 to the Confederacy while it was still at sea.

France regained normal diplomatic relations with the US in 1866, and withdrew its troops from Mexico because of threats from Washington.

See also
United Kingdom and the American Civil War
Presidency of Abraham Lincoln
Second French Empire
Second French intervention in Mexico
Foreign enlistment in the American Civil War

References

Further reading 
 Ameur, Farid, "Les Français dans la guerre de Sécession", Rennes, PUR, 2016.
 Blackburn, George M. "Paris Newspapers and the American Civil War," Illinois Historical Journal (1991)  84#3 pp 177–193. online
 Blackburn, George M. French Newspaper Opinion on the American Civil War (1997).
 Blumenthal, Henry. A Reappraisal of Franco-American Relations, 1830-1871 (1959)
 Blumenthal, Henry.  France and the United States: Their Diplomatic Relations (1970)
 Case, Lynn M.,  and Warren E. Spencer. The United States and France: Civil War Diplomacy (1970); the standard scholarly study.
 Doyle, Don H. The cause of all nations: An international history of the American civil war (Basic Books, 2014).
 Hanna, Alfred Jackson, and Kathryn Abbey Hanna. Napoleon III and Mexico: American triumph over monarchy (1971).
 Hardy, William E. "South of the border: Ulysses S. Grant and the French intervention." Civil War History 54#1 (2008): 63-86. 
 John, Rachel St. "The Unpredictable America of William Gwin: Expansion, Secession, and the Unstable Borders of Nineteenth-Century North America." The Journal of the Civil War Era 6.1 (2016): 56-84. online
 Jones, Howard. Blue & Gray Diplomacy: A History of Union and Confederate Foreign Relations (2010). online
 Jordan, Donaldson, and Edwin J. Pratt. Europe and the American Civil War (2nd ed. 1969). chap. 13
 Owsley, Frank L. King Cotton Diplomacy: Foreign Relations of the Confederate States of America (1931), chap. 9.
 Peraino, Kevin. "Lincoln vs. Napoleon" in Peraino, Lincoln in the World: The Making of a Statesman and the Dawn of American Power (2013) pp 224–95.
 Pinkney, David H.  "France and the Civil War," in Harold Hyman, ed. Heard Round the World (1969)
 Sainlaude Stève, France and the American Civil War: a diplomatic history (2019) online review; also online round table; also 
 Sears, Louis Martin. "A Confederate Diplomat at the Court of Napoleon III," American Historical Review (1921) 26#2  pp. 255–281 in JSTOR on Slidell.
 Wahlstrom, Todd W. The Southern Exodus to Mexico: Migration Across the Borderlands After the American Civil War (U of Nebraska Press, 2015).
 West,  W. Reed. Contemporary French Opinion on the American Civil War (1924).

American Civil War
France
France
Civil War
Second French Empire